Visitors to Peru must obtain a visa from one of the Peruvian diplomatic missions unless they come from one of the visa exempt countries.

Visa policy map

Visa policy
Holders of passports of the following 100 jurisdictions can visit Peru for tourism purposes (unless otherwise stated) without a visa for up to 183 days, (except Schengen Area member states and associated countries whose citizens may stay up to 90 days within 180 days without a visa, and Costa Rica and Panama whose citizens are allowed to stay for 90 days per visit):

ID - may cross the border with either ID card or passport.
B - may visit without a visa for business purposes as well.

Holders of diplomatic, official or service passports (except for Venezuela) do not require a visa.

Participants and members of the press of the XVIII Pan American Games (XVIII Juegos Panamericanos), which will take place from 26 July to 11 August 2019, can enter Peru with a visa attached on the reverse of their accreditation card.

Participants and members of the press of the VI Parapan American Games (VI Parapanamericanos), which will take place from 23 August to 1 September 2019, can enter Peru with a visa attached on the reverse of their accreditation card.

APEC Business Travel Card
Holders of passports issued by the following countries who possess an APEC Business Travel Card (ABTC) containing the "PER" code on the reverse that it is valid for travel to Peru can enter visa-free for business trips for up to 90 days.

ABTCs are issued to nationals of:

Arrival statistics

Most visitors arriving to Peru on short-term basis were from the following countries of residence:

See also

Visa requirements for Peruvian citizens

References

Peru
Foreign relations of Peru